The following railroad companies became part of the St. Louis–San Francisco Railway (Frisco) system, usually through consolidation.

Early lines in Missouri and Kansas
The Frisco started out as the Southwest Branch (heading west-southwesterly from St. Louis) of the Pacific (later Missouri Pacific) Railroad, and was split out in 1866. That same year, Congress incorporated the Atlantic and Pacific Railroad, which would end up extending the line through Springfield and Tulsa to Sapulpa.

St. Louis, Memphis and Southeastern Railroad

Kansas City, Fort Scott and Memphis Railway

Other extensions into Arkansas, Oklahoma, and Texas
Because of a provision of the Texas Constitution, railroad companies operating in that state had to be incorporated in Texas. The Frisco's primary Texas subsidiary was the St. Louis, San Francisco and Texas Railway (Frisco of Texas).

Other extensions through Mississippi and Alabama

References